The 1868 Pontefract by-election was held on 21 December 1868.  The by-election was held due to the incumbent Liberal MP, Hugh Childers, becoming First Lord of the Admiralty.  It was retained by Childers who was unopposed.

References

1868 elections in the United Kingdom
1868 in England
19th century in Yorkshire
December 1868 events
Pontefract
Elections in Wakefield
By-elections to the Parliament of the United Kingdom in West Yorkshire constituencies
Unopposed ministerial by-elections to the Parliament of the United Kingdom